Prunus cerasia is a species of flowering plant in the family Rosaceae, native to Lebanon and Syria. It is hexaploid that has been characterized as either a landrace or a wild species of plum.

References

cerasia
Flora of Lebanon
Flora of Syria
Plants described in 1896